Action for ME is a charitable organisation and self-help group based in the United Kingdom and dedicated to helping people with M.E., which stands for two alternate terms for the same disease: myalgic encephalomyelitis and myalgic encephalopathy. M.E. is also known as chronic fatigue syndrome (CFS), ME/CFS and post-viral fatigue syndrome.

The organisation was founded by patients in 1987 as The M.E. Action Campaign and changed its name to 'Action for M.E.' in 1993.

References

External links
 Official website

Non-profit organisations based in the United Kingdom
Chronic fatigue syndrome